Maqbool Ahmed Lari (1916-2004) was an Indian social worker, philanthropist, Urdu writer, and the founder of Mir Academy, Lucknow. Born in May 1916 at Lar in Deoria district in the Indian state of Uttar Pradesh in a clan of Iraqi Biradari, he graduated in arts and migrated to Nepal in search of livelihood in 1942 where he stayed for 10 years.

Lari was a member of the senate of Tribhuvan University, Kathmandu, for 10 years and was a member of the Urdu Rabita Committee, Lucknow. He was the major financial contributor for the establishment of Lari Cardiology Centre at King George's Medical University, Lucknow, a centre founded by renowned cardiologist, Mansoor Hasan. His contributions were reported in the field of child education and was instrumental in the publication of Hadeed-e-Meer, a collection of poems of Mir Taqi Mir, renowned Urdu poet.

A recipient of the title, Royal Gorkha from the Government of Nepal, he was honoured by the Government of India in 1971 with Padma Shri, the fourth highest Indian civilian award. Maqbool Ahmed Lari died on 17 May 2004 at Lucknow at the age of 88.

See also

 Mir Taqi Mir
 Mansoor Hasan

References

Recipients of the Padma Shri in literature & education
1916 births
2004 deaths
People from Deoria district
20th-century Indian Muslims
Indian people of Iraqi descent
Scholars from Lucknow
Social workers
Social workers from Uttar Pradesh
20th-century Indian philanthropists